Trihas Gebre Aunoon (born 29 April 1990) is an Ethiopian-born long-distance runner who competes for Spain internationally. She competed in the 10,000 metres at the 2015 World Championships in Beijing finishing 16th.

International competitions

Personal bests
Outdoor
5000 metres – 15:27.94 (Huelva 2015)
10,000 metres – 32:03.39 (Ostrava 2013)
Half marathon – 1:09:51  NR (Olomouc 2018)
Marathon – 2:32:13 (Berlin 2018)
3000 metres steeplechase – 10:13.73 (Bilbao 2008)

References

External links

1990 births
Living people
Sportspeople from Tigray Region
Naturalised citizens of Spain
Ethiopian emigrants to Spain
Spanish female long-distance runners
Ethiopian female long-distance runners
Ethiopian female marathon runners
Spanish female marathon runners
Ethiopian female steeplechase runners
Spanish female steeplechase runners
World Athletics Championships athletes for Spain
Athletes (track and field) at the 2016 Summer Olympics
Olympic athletes of Spain
Spanish people of Ethiopian descent
Spanish sportspeople of African descent
Sportspeople of Ethiopian descent